Cyathermia is a genus of sea snails, marine gastropod mollusks in the family Neomphalidae.

Species
Species within the genus Cyathermia include:
 Cyathermia naticoides Warén & Bouchet, 1989

References

Neomphalidae
Monotypic gastropod genera